Eupithecia cerussaria is a moth in the family Geometridae. It is found on Cyprus and in Greece and the Near East.

References

Moths described in 1855
cerussaria
Moths of Europe
Moths of Asia